Semyonovskoye-Krasnoye is a rural locality (a selo) in Pavlovskoye Rural Settlement, Suzdalsky District, Vladimir Oblast, Russia. The population was 299 as of 2010. There are 3 streets.

Geography 
Semyonovskoye-Krasnoye is located 11 km south of Suzdal (the district's administrative centre) by road. Tereneyevo is the nearest rural locality.

References 

Rural localities in Suzdalsky District